Ariyavan is a 2023 Indian Tamil-language action drama film directed by Mithran R Jawahar. The film stars Ishaaon and Pranali Ghogare in the lead roles with Daniel Balaji, Sathyan, Supergood Subramani and Rama portraying supporting roles. The film was released theatrically on 3 March 2023.

Cast

Production 
The film was announced on February 12, 2022, mentioning Ishaaon's debut as an actor playing the lead role. Pranali Ghogare makes her Tamil debut with this film.

Music
The music of the film is composed by James Vasanthan, Ved Shankar and Giri Nandh.

Reception 
The film was released on 3 March 2023 across Tamil Nadu. A critic from Malalai malar gave 'Director Mithran Jawahar has directed the film with a conventional story and a different screenplay. He moves the scenes briskly by differentiating the characters and setting'. Critic from Times of india said 'Ariyavan may not be a complete failure, but it lacks the substance and creativity needed to truly make an impact. ' with 2.5 stars out of five stars. Cinemaexpress gave moxure of review "nothing could salvage this film that does not have its heart in its right place" 1 out of 5 starts. Dinathanthi Reviewer mixture of review'

References

External links 
 

Indian action drama films
2020s Tamil-language films